The 1924–25 season was the 26th season for FC Barcelona.

Events

This year they celebrate the silver anniversary of their 25 years of history. Jesza Poszony is named new coach, the Hungarian enters with good feet and wins two Titles: the Catalunya Cup to Europe, (maximum rival in those moments), and the Glass of Spain. As a result of a match against Jupiter in homage to the Orfeo Catalá, the bureaucratic problems returned against Barça. Before the party (that did not have permission of the governing authority) the fans roared the Royal March, reason why the Captain General Milans of the Bosch closes the field of Les Corts by 6 Months and the prohibition of participating in any other act. The dictatorship forced Joan Gamper to leave for a time outside of Catalonia, Gamper promised that he would never again be a Club official. All this led irreparably to the disappearance of Barça, but the Catalans, Partners, Banca Jover (with financial aid) and the Catalan Federation (which postponed the start of the Catalunya Cto. until Barça could participate) did not succeed. In the middle of the dictatorship, the Club underwent an internal renovation that led to the presidency to Arcadi Balaguer, this got that the sanction of Les Corts was reduced to 3 months.

Results 

 1. The public whistled the Spanish national anthem. The military authorities closed the club for six months and suspended Gamper as president of the Club for the incidents, forcing him to go abroad immediately.

 2 The referee suspended the match to rest to avoid further incidents, repeating the party and later canceled it.

External links

webdelcule.com
webdelcule.com

References

FC Barcelona seasons
Barcelona